Todd Loyd (born December 20, 1975) is an American theatre director, actor, teacher, artistic director, and entrepreneur. Not to be confused with Todd Loyd actor/author.

Loyd attended the Pacific Conservatory for the Performing Arts in Santa Maria, California, the University of North Carolina School of the Arts in Winston-Salem, North Carolina (BFA) and Touro College (MA in Early Childhood and Special Education).  His assisting credits on Broadway include Baz Luhrmann's "La Boheme" (2002) and "The Color Purple" (2005).  He has worked at The Kennedy Center, Lincoln Center, the Eugene O'Neill Playwrights Conference, New York Musical Theatre Festival, National Alliance for Musical Theatre and Cedar Lake Contemporary Ballet.

He served as the Producing Artistic Director of Sonnet Repertory Theatre. At present, he works with nursery school children in New York City and hosts the Little Kids, Big Hearts podcast in partnership with Noggin and Sparkler Learning. The podcast can help parents and educators introduce big topics in social and emotional learning to their children and explores what it means to have a big heart and how to grow one with episodes focused on identity, friendship, and standing up for others.

Through Sonnet Repertory Theatre, Loyd has worked with Christine Baranski, Susan Blackwell, Celia Keenan-Bolger, Jeff Bowen, Tituss Burgess, Kerry Butler, Jason Robert Brown, Michael Cerveris, Olympia Dukakis, William Finn, Stephen Flaherty, Adam Guettel, Victor Garber, Jonathan Groff, Ethan Hawke, Megan Hilty, Hal Holbrook, Cheyenne Jackson, Brian d'Arcy James, Carol Kane, Tom Kitt, Kevin Kline, Henry Krieger, Linda Lavin, Robert Sean Leonard, Robert Lopez, Patti LuPone, Jerry Mitchell, Terrence Mann, Alan Menken, Lou Meyers, David Miller, Julia Murney, Marsha Norman, Manu Narayan, Mandy Patinkin, David Rasche, Chita Rivera, Duncan Sheik, David Shire, Julie Taymor, Alfred Uhry, Marc Shaiman and Scott Wittman, and Alfre Woodard.  Sonnet Repertory Theatre's advisory board includes Paul Barnes, Gary Beach, William Cantler, Gerald Freedman, Peter Hedges, Joe Mantello, Jack O’Brien, Mary-Louise Parker, Bernard Telsey, and Celia Weston.

References

External links 
http://www.playbill.com/news/article/172179-PHOTO-CALL-Jonathan-Groff-Cheyenne-Jackson-Patrick-Page-Honor-Julie-Taymor-at-Sonnet-Rep-Gala
http://www.theatermania.com/new-york-city-theater/reviews/08-2012/the-picture-of-dorian-gray_60450.html
 http://broadwayworld.com/article/Photo-Coverage-Patti-LuPone-Kevin-Kline-Jeremy-Jordan-More-Lead-Sonnet-Rep-Benefit-20111116
 http://broadwayworld.com/people/Todd_Loyd/
 http://theater.nytimes.com/show/24997/Twelfth-Night/overview
 http://offoffbroadway.broadwayworld.com/article/Photo-Flash-Sonnet-Reps-CAUCASIAN-CHALK-CIRCLE-20110729
 http://broadwayworld.com/article/Photo_Coverage_Sonnet_Rep_Honors_Jack_OBrien_20101109
 http://offbroadway.broadwayworld.com/article/Photo_Flash_Sonnet_Rep_Presents_TWELFTH_NIGHT_20100723
 http://offoffbroadway.broadwayworld.com/article/BWW_Special_Feature_99_and_Under_the_Radar_Acknowledging_the_Architects_20100528
 http://offoffbroadway.broadwayworld.com/article/Sonnet_Repertory_Theatre_Matchbook_Productions_Present_RICHARD_II_5724_20100523
 http://broadwayworld.com/article/SRTs_Sonnet_Sings_the_Bard_Benefit_to_Feature_Shaiman_Wittman_Shire_More_1116_Seth_Rudetsky_Hosts_20091116
 http://offbroadway.broadwayworld.com/article/Sonnet_Repertory_Theatre_Presents_ONE_Opens_825_At_59E59_Theatres_20090824
 http://broadwayworld.com/article/Photo_Flash_Sonnet_Rep_Benefit_at_Birdland_Jazz_Club_20081120
 http://offoffbroadway.broadwayworld.com/article/SRT_Presents_A_Midsummer_Nights_Dream_on_July_18th_20080718
 http://cabaret.broadwayworld.com/article/Photo_Coverage_Sonnet_Sings_The_Bard_20071114
 http://broadwayworld.com/article/Ceder_Lake_Arts_Present_RAW_March_621_20050301
 http://www.playbill.com/news/article/139426-PHOTO-CALL-Richard-II-at-Sonnet-Rep
 http://www.playbill.com/news/article/91488-Cedar-Lake-Arts-Gets-Raw-March-6-21
 https://www.bigheartworld.org/little-kids-big-hearts-podcast/
 https://podcasts.apple.com/us/podcast/little-kids-big-hearts/id1560907375
 https://www.commonsensemedia.org/podcast-reviews/little-kids-big-hearts

1975 births
Living people
American theatre directors
American male stage actors